David Guasch (born 3 January 1990), also known by the nicknames of "Gash" or "Gush", is a French professional rugby league footballer formerly of the Catalans Dragons in the Super League, the elite competition of northern hemisphere rugby league. Guasch came through the youth ranks at Catalans Dragons. In 2014 he signed for newly promoted Palau Broncos

Background
David Guasch was born in Perpignan, Languedoc-Roussillon, France.

References

External links
Catalans Dragons profile

1990 births
Living people
Catalans Dragons players
French rugby league players
Lézignan Sangliers players
Palau Broncos players
Rugby league five-eighths
Rugby league fullbacks
Sportspeople from Perpignan